Guard No. 47 is a 2008 Czech film by director Filip Renč.  It is based on the 1926 Josef Kopta novel Guard No. 47, and stars Karel Roden and Lucia Siposová.

The film won three Czech Lion awards and four Golden Reel awards at the Tiburon International Film Festival in 2009.

Cast
 Karel Roden as Frantisek Dousa
 Lucia Siposova as Anicka Dousová
 Václav Jirácek as Ferda
 Vladimír Dlouhý as Bartik

External links
 

2008 films
2000s thriller drama films
Czech thriller films
Czech war films
Films based on Czech novels
Czech Lion Awards winners (films)
2008 drama films
2000s Czech films